Canadian Pacific 1278 is a class "G5d" 4-6-2 "Pacific" type steam locomotive built by the Canadian Locomotive Company for the Canadian Pacific Railway.

History

Revenue service 
Just like sister engine Canadian Pacific 1293, the engine was built by Canadian Locomotive Company in 1948 and is a type 4-6-2 class G5d light weight "Pacific" locomotive. The engine worked most of its career hauling freight and passenger trains throughout the Canadian Pacific Railway until it was retired from revenue service in 1960.

Steamtown 
After sitting idle for five years, the locomotive was purchased by F. Nelson Blount for his Steamtown, U.S.A. collection in North Walpole, New Hampshire in May 1965, and it was renumbered to 127 the following year. Blount had planned to renumber all three of the CPR G5 locomotives in his collection from 1246, 1278 and 1293 to 124, 127 and 129 respectively, but the engine was the only one of the three that underwent the change. The new number remained on the locomotive from 1966 until 1973, when its former number was restored. No. 1278 was leased to Ross Rowland, who used the locomotive to pull his very first High Iron Company (HICO) excursion between Jersey City and Jim Thorpe, Pennsylvania on October 13, 1966. In early February 1968, HICO sponsored a doubleheader excursion over the Central Railroad of New Jersey's mainline between Jersey City and Wilkes-Barre, pulled by fellow G5 locomotives 1238 and 1286, while leasing them from George Hart. However, the latter two locomotives were on loan to the city of Reading for emergency warmth after a steam generator broke down. Since tickets for the excursion had already been sold, and Rowland was unwilling to pull the HICO excursion with a diesel locomotive, he leased No. 1278. However, since No. 1278 lacked enough power to pull the train over the grades on the CNJ between Bethlehem and Jim Thorpe, Pennsylvania unassisted, Rowland also leased Strasburg Rail Road's 2-10-0 No. 90 to assist No. 1278. The locomotive returned to Steamtown soon after the excursion ended.

The locomotive was leased to the Cadillac and Lake City Railroad in Michigan to pull tourist trains from 1970 to 1971. After some repair work, the locomotive was returned to Steamtown, U.S.A. in Bellows Falls, Vermont where it served on excursion runs. During the sesquicentennial of the Delaware and Hudson Railway, the 1278 was fitted with elephant-eared smoke deflectors to masquerade as D&H P-1 4-6-2 No. 653, and it performed one doubleheader with Reading T-1 4-8-4 No. 2102, which masqueraded as D&H No. 302 at the time. No. 1278 pulled her last excursion train for Steamtown in 1976, before it was removed from service due to her flue time running out, and it was subsequently put back on static display and replaced by G3c 4-6-2 No. 2317 for Steamtown's active roster at the time.

Gettysburg Railroad 
After Steamtown moved to Scranton, Pennsylvania, Steamtown decided that their G5 locomotives were inadequate for service as they were deemed too light for the heavy grades and sharp curves of their Ex-Lackawanna line, hence why No. 1278 never operated in Scranton. In 1987, No. 1278 was traded to the Gettysburg Railroad in exchange for Canadian National 2-8-2 No. 3254 in order to meet the demand for a stronger locomotive to pull Steamtown's longer trains. After some loose repairs were made, the Gettysburg Railroad brought No. 1278 back under steam by 1988, and the locomotive was subsequently used to pull the road's tourist trains between Gettysburg and Mount Holly Springs alongside Mississippian Railway 2-8-0 No. 76, until 1995.

Disposition 
No. 1278 was indefinitely retired from excursion service after its boiler incident, and it was subsequently purchased by Jerry Joe Jacobson at an auction in 1998 as a possible spare parts provider for No. 1293. Since 1999, it sat in an Ohio Central Railroad storage facility in Morgan Run, Ohio for several years. In 2016, No. 1278 was moved inside the Age of Steam Roundhouse in Sugarcreek, Ohio, safely out of the weather. The damage from the firebox incident is repairable, and the engine could be restored to operation if desired, however, the engine remains on static display within the roundhouse as of 2022.

1995 boiler explosion 
On Friday, June 16, 1995, engine 1278 was taking a Summer Eve Dinner Excursion to Mount Holly Springs, but at 7 p.m. at Garners while moving at 15 miles per hour, the locomotive’s firebox suffered a backdraft explosion. Scalding steam and flames burned all three of 1278’s crew members badly. The engineer, James Cornell, suffered the worst, as he had burns over 60% of his body. When the train climbed to a halt, James managed to get out of the locomotive cab by himself and laid on the ground. He was then helped by the fireman and other members of the train crew. Ambulances arrived minutes later to take them to area hospitals. One of the two fireman in the cab that day, who immediately left the cab by the doorway, had second and third-degree burns over 10% of his body. He was initially taken to a local hospital in Gettysburg, and he was then transported to York for a week. It took him three and a half months to recover from the burns. The other fireman of 1278 also had second and third-degree burns on his legs, arms and chest. He had fractured legs from jumping out of the cab window. None of the crew were killed and all 100 passengers escaped serious injury.

While the 1278 was mostly intact, it’s firebox suffered major damage; the crown sheet toward the front tubesheet, next to the rear tube sheet knuckle, had bulged down to a foot, composing an area at about 60 crown stays. The crownsheet holes around the crown stays have been deformed, creating gaps around the crown stay heads. It also had a 6 inch tare and also 2 front right knuckles have broke off and fallen on the ash pan below. However, the way 1278’s firebox was designed prevented the boiler itself from suffering an external explosion, which in turn prevented deaths and additional injuries. 
  
An investigation was quickly put into motion by the National Transportation Safety Board (NTSB), who initially concluded not enough water was flowing in the engine boiler, but as the investigation progressed, more contributing factors to the explosion were discovered. Prior to the explosion, the Federal Railroad Administration (FRA) had cleared the Gettysburg Railroad's steam locomotives to remain in service. As it turned out, the GRR poorly maintained their locomotives, such as 1278 not having any necessary care for most of its components, including the water glass. Only the GRR’s owner, Sloan Cornell, knew how to properly maintain and operate steam engines, but at the time of the explosion, Sloan was concentrating his efforts on his other tourist operation, the Knox and Kane Railroad, leaving his son, wife, and other people in charge of the GRR, but most of them were inexperienced in operating a steam engine, as a result of a lack of a proper training program. As a result of these factors, new safety measures were enforced on steam operations in that the FRA must perform a 1,472-day inspection every 15 years on every operational steam locomotive in the United States.

Surviving sister engines 

 No. 1201 is currently on static display inside the Canada Science and Technology Museum in Ottawa, Ontario in Canada.
 No. 1238 is currently in storage under private ownership at the Prairie Dog Central Railway in Winnipeg, Manitoba in Canada.
 No. 1246 is currently in storage at the Railroad Museum of New England in Thomaston, Connecticut in the United States.
 No. 1286 is currently in storage under private ownership at the Prairie Dog Central Railway in Winnipeg, Manitoba in Canada.
 No. 1293 is currently on display at the Age of Steam Roundhouse in Sugarcreek, Ohio in the United States, waiting for a rebuild.

References

4-6-2 locomotives
1278
Steam locomotives of the United States
CLC locomotives
Individual locomotives of Canada
Preserved steam locomotives of Canada
Standard gauge locomotives of Canada
Standard gauge locomotives of the United States
Preserved steam locomotives of Ohio
Railway locomotives introduced in 1948